Euskadi Roja or Euzkadi Roja ('Red Euskadi') was a newspaper published by the Basque-Navarre Federation of the Communist Party of Spain. Parts of the newspaper was printed in Euskera.

Euskadi Roja replaced an earlier party organ in Vizcaya, Bandera Roja. Initially, Euskadi Roja was published weekly from Bilbao. The first issue came out in March 1933. Notably, this was the first time the communist movement used the term 'Euskadi' for the Basque Country (a term that had exclusively been used by the nationalist movement). Towards the end of 1935 the newspaper was moved to San Sebastián. As the Spanish Civil War broke out and San Sebastian fell, the newspaper moved back to Bilbao. On December 2, 1936 it was converted into a daily newspaper. As of February–March 1937 Euskadi Roja had a daily circulation of 45,000–48,000. Apart from being circulated in Basque Country, Euskadi Roja was read in Santander and Asturias.

At the time, Euskadi Roja was considered one of the Spanish communist publications of higher quality. Ramón Ormazabal and Ricardo Urondo served as directors of Euskadi Roja.

After the fall of Bilbao, the newspaper re-appeared in Barcelona as a weekly. Euskadi Roja continued publication in exile in France after the war, as the central organ of the Communist Party of Euskadi with Ormazabal as its director. It was printed at the Croissant printing company, and had its office at 8, . The newspaper was banned in France, along with the Communist Party of Spain. The ban came into effect on October 27, 1950.

References

External links

 

1933 establishments in Spain
1950 disestablishments in France
Communist Party of Spain
Defunct newspapers published in Spain
Defunct weekly newspapers
Newspapers published in Barcelona
Mass media in Bilbao
Mass media in San Sebastián
Newspapers published in Paris
Publications established in 1933
Publications disestablished in 1950
Spanish-language communist newspapers
Weekly newspapers published in France
Weekly newspapers published in Spain
Defunct newspapers published in France
Daily newspapers published in France